José Celestino Mutis Airport  is an airport serving Bahía Solano, a municipality of the Chocó Department in Colombia.

Facilities 

Airlines and destinations

References

External links 
 
 

Airports in Colombia
Buildings and structures in Chocó Department